Mill Race Park is a city-owned park located in Columbus, Indiana (Bartholomew County), where the Flat Rock and the Driftwood rivers join together (forming the east fork of the White River) in downtown Columbus.

History 
Historically, Mill Race Park was an impoverished area of Columbus. During the 1930s through the early 1960s the area was plagued by rodents, disease and sub-standard housing. Located in a flood plain the homes were prone to flooding, creating an inhospitable place to live; the area became known as "Death Valley". In 1963, the park site was purchased by the city and cleaned up, transforming it into the first iteration of Mill Race Park (originally called Tipton Park). In the late 1980s a redesign and update was awarded to Michael Van Valkenburgh Associates, resulting in the completion of the current design of Mill Race Park in 1993.

Features 
Mill Race park is composed of  including a playground and an  observation tower. The land is subject to severe annual flooding, during which sixty percent of the park is under water. The site features a loop road around the perimeter of the park, path systems, and two small lakes connected by a wooden bridge.

Key design features include a circular lake to contrast the soft natural curves of the surrounding river. The circular lake is defined by a masonry walk at its perimeter and surrounded by flowering trees. An earthen amphitheater, inspired by Native American earthworks found in the Ohio River Valley, is located at the end of a broad field, and forms a crest of land that remains above the water during floods. The covered bridge harkens back to the local history of numerous covered bridges found across the landscape.

The park also offers fishing, basketball courts, and the People Trail. An interpretive boardwalk that ties the existing park wetland to a path system that continues into the surrounding community. Access to the park is provided by a loop road and the introduction of a river walk.
Additionally the park is home to numerous events, festivities, and programs throughout the year.

References

External links

Columbus, Indiana
Parks in Indiana
Covered bridges in Indiana
Redeveloped ports and waterfronts in the United States
Protected areas of Bartholomew County, Indiana
Tourist attractions in Bartholomew County, Indiana
Wooden bridges in Indiana